Meganoton loeffleri is a moth of the  family Sphingidae. It is known from Thailand.

References

Meganoton
Moths described in 2003